Narissara Nena France (born 9 September 1990) is a British-Thai model, musician and beauty pageant titleholder who was crowned Miss Universe Great Britain 2015. She represented her country at the Miss Universe 2015 pageant.

Personal life
Narissara was born in Norwich, England. She is of both British and Thai descent, formerly working as a model in London full-time. Narissara was crowned Miss London 2013 by Amy Willerton, Miss Universe Great Britain 2015, in London and went on to compete in the Miss England contest, placing in second.

Miss Universe Great Britain 2015
On 26 June 2015 Narissara was crowned Miss Universe Great Britain 2015 in Cardiff, Wales. As Miss Universe Great Britain, she participated in the Miss Universe 2015 pageant in Las Vegas, where she did not place.

Notes

External links
Official website

Living people
Miss Universe 2015 contestants
Models from London
1990 births
English female models
English people of Thai descent
21st-century English women
21st-century English people